The men's high jump event at the 1970 British Commonwealth Games was held on 17 and 18 July at the Meadowbank Stadium in Edinburgh, Scotland.

Medalists

Results

Qualification

Final

References

Qualification results (p28)
Final results (p9)
Australian results

Athletics at the 1970 British Commonwealth Games
1970